Lepidoblepharis victormartinezi is a species of gecko, a lizard in the family Sphaerodactylidae. The species is endemic to Panama.

Etymology
The specific name, victormartinezi, is in honor of Panamanian herpetologist Victor Martínez Cortés.

Geographic range
L. victormartinezi is found in Colón Province, Panamá.

Description

References

Further reading
Batista, Abel; Ponce, Marcos; Vesely, Milan; Mebert, Konrad; Hertz, Andreas; Köhler, Gunther; Carrizo, Arcadio; Lotzkat, Sebastian (2015). "Revision of the genus Lepidoblepharis (Reptilia: Squamata: Sphaerodactylidae) in Central America, with description of three new species". Zootaxa 3994 (2): 187–221. (Lepidoblepharis victormartinezi, new species, pp. 201-204 + Figures 3–6, 12).

Lepidoblepharis
Reptiles described in 2015
Taxa named by Gunther Köhler